Victor Jo Yu is a Filipino politician who currently serves as Governor of Zamboanga del Sur. He previously served as the representative of the first district of Zamboanga del Sur in the 14th, 15th and 16th Congress of the Philippines. He signed the House Resolution 1109 calling for a constituent assembly to amend the Constitution.  

During the 2019 Elections, he defeated Antonio H. Cerilles by almost 100,000 votes and became Governor of Zamboanga del Sur, ending the 18-year tenure of Antonio Cerilles as governor of the province.

Personal life
He is the son of Paking Yu of Zamboanga Motors and Ramona Fishing Corporation based in Pagadian. He is married to Divina Grace Cabardo; they have three children.

In September 2021, Yu announced that he contracted the COVID-19 virus.

See also
List of representatives elected in the Philippine House of Representatives elections, 2010

References

Year of birth missing (living people)
Living people
People from Pagadian
Members of the House of Representatives of the Philippines from Zamboanga del Sur
Nationalist People's Coalition politicians
Governors of Zamboanga del Sur